Lemuel Dorcas is a fictional character appearing in American comic books published by Marvel Comics. He is notable for playing a part in the origins of Namor villains Tiger Shark, Orka, and Piranha.

Publication history
Dr. Lemuel Dorcas first appeared in Sub-Mariner #5-6 (September-October 1968), and was created by Roy Thomas and John Buscema.

The character subsequently appeared in Sub-Mariner #15 (July 1969), #23-24 (March-April 1970), #33 (January 1971), Marvel Team-Up #14 (October 1973), and Super-Villain Team-Up #1-3 (August-December 1975). The character made a posthumous appearance in Marvel Tales #249 (May 1991), and his body was later dumped into the ocean in Namor #42 (September 1993).

Doctor Dorcas received an entry in the Official Handbook of the Marvel Universe Deluxe Edition #17.

Fictional character biography
Dr. Lemuel Dorcas was a marine biologist, genetic engineer, inventor, and would-be conqueror. Dorcas was responsible for transforming injured Olympic swimmer Todd Arliss into the superhuman Tiger Shark by blending his DNA with the DNA samples of Namor and a tiger shark. Dorcas planned to use Tiger Shark as a pawn in his schemes of world conquest.

Dorcas formed an alliance with the Atlantean Warlord Krang. Krang provided his follower Orka as a test subject and Dorcas endowed Orka with the powers of a killer whale. Warlord Krang and Dorcas used Orka and a fleet of killer whales to attack Atlantis, but were thwarted by Namor and interference by Tiger Shark.

Dorcas and Warlord Krang later formed a secret alliance with Byrrah in a plot to keep Namor from being crowned prince of Atlantis and allow Byrrah to take the crown. Namor captured Dorcas and Warlord Krang, who revealed Byrrah's involvement in the plot, thus ruining his bid for power.

Dorcas was also responsible for the creation of Piranha when a normal piranha was exposed to the remaining radiation from Dorcas' previous experiment.

Attuma, Dorcas, and Tiger Shark captured Hydro-Base and took Namor prisoner there. Namor regained his freedom with the help of the Hydro-Men and attacked the conspirators, throwing Tiger Shark into one of Attuma's war machines. As Dorcas was able to fire a lethal blast from his hand weapon at Namor, the machine toppled on top of Dorcas and crushed him to death.

Namor and Stingray pushed the Octo-Mek and Dorcas's corpse into the ocean. The Octo-Mek later developed slight sentience and became a robot based on Dorcas.

Lemuel Dorcas turns up alive, having survived due to the starfish-related experiments he had conducted upon himself and kept his survival secret. Upon setting up a base in Tetiaroa Atoll, Doctor Dorcas mutated several creatures to serve him and kept them under his control with neuroleeches. He also hired the handsome Kei to bring him women. Lemuel Dorcas then developed an obsession for Songbird where he kidnapped her and repaired her vocal cords as he intends to make Songbird his slave. However, Songbird was able to escape from Doctor Dorcas's clutches, as with the surgery restoring her persuasive powers as well, she turned Doctor Dorcas's henchmen against him.

Powers and abilities
Lemuel Dorcas did not have powers at first, but he does possess scientific knowledge. He employed many devices ranging from the Morphotron to laser guns and nuclear bombs.

Upon resurfacing following his apparent death, Dorcas mutated himself with starfish tissue, which allows him to breathe underwater or regrow lost limbs.

Other versions
A version of Dorcas appears in the Ultimate Marvel reality. This version is an Atlantean who serves as an advisor to Namora. During the "Ultimatum" storyline, the Thing, Invisible Woman, and Dr. Arthur Molekevic fight Doctor Dorcas alongside Namora and Tiger Shark in Atlantis and defeat him.

References

Characters created by John Buscema
Characters created by Roy Thomas
Comics characters introduced in 1968
Fictional biologists
Marvel Comics characters with accelerated healing
Marvel Comics hybrids
Marvel Comics male supervillains
Marvel Comics mutates
Marvel Comics scientists
Marvel Comics supervillains